Qılıncbəyli (known as Pravda until 1998) is a village and municipality in the Shamkir Rayon of Azerbaijan, located at 243 metres above sea level. It has a population of 1,277.

References

Populated places in Shamkir District